Correa is a Spanish surname. Correa is found throughout the Iberian Peninsula. Correa means 'leather strap', 'belt', 'rein', 'shoelace', plural correas. Correa is from the Latin corrigia 'fastening', from corrigere 'to straighten', 'to correct'), applied as a metonymic occupational name for a maker or seller of such articles. Correa is spelt Correia in Portuguese and Galician.

Arts
 Aurora Correa (1930–2008), Spanish-Mexican teacher and writer
 Caroline Correa (born 1979), Brazilian actress
 Chamin Correa (1929–2020), Mexican guitarist
 Drew Correa (born 1984), American music producer
 Enrique Gómez Correa (1915–1995), Chilean poet, lawyer and diplomat
 Eric "Bobo" Correa (born 1968), American musician
 Francisco Correa de Arauxo (1584–1654), Spanish organist and composer of the late Renaissance
 Francisco Laguna Correa (born 1982), Mexican writer and editor
 Hugo Correa (1926–2008), Chilean science fiction writer
 Juan Correa (1646–1716), Mexican painter
 Juan Correa de Vivar (1510–1566), Spanish painter
 Julio Correa (1890–1953), Paraguayan poet
 Mayuto Correa (born 1943), Brazilian percussionist, guitarist and composer
 Tiago Correa (born 1981), Chilean actor

Politicians
 Eric Correa Rivera (born 1975), Puerto Rican politician
 Lou Correa (born 1958), American-Puerto Rican politician
 Marie-Louise Correa (born 1943), Senegalese politician
 Rafael Correa (born 1963), Ecuadorian politician, 43rd President of Ecuador
 Ruth Stella Correa Palacio (born 1959), Colombian politician

Sportspeople

Footballers
 Alejandro Correa (born 1979), Uruguayan footballer
 Andrés Correa (born 1994), Colombian footballer
 Andrés Felipe Correa (born 1984), Colombian footballer
 Ángel Correa (born 1995), Argentine footballer
 Bernardo Correa (born 1995), Chilean footballer
 Cláudio Correa (born 1993), Paraguayan footballer
 Fernando Correa (born 1974), Uruguayan footballer
 Gabriel Correa (footballer) (born 1968), Uruguayan footballer
 Gary Correa (born 1990), Peruvian footballer
 Jaime Correa (born 1979), Mexican footballer
 Joaquín Correa (born 1994), Argentine footballer
 Jorge Correa (born 1993), Argentine footballer
 José Erick Correa (born 1992), Colombian footballer
 Julio Correa (born 1948), Uruguayan footballer
 Lucas Correa (born 1984), Argentine footballer
 Maximiliano Correa (born 1989), Argentine footballer
 Nicolás Correa (born 1983), Uruguayan footballer
 Pablo Correa (born 1967), Uruguayan football manager and former player
 Rober Correa (born 1992), Spanish footballer
 Rubén Correa (born 1941), Peruvian footballer
 Tomi Correa (born 1984), Spanish footballer
 Vanina Correa (born 1983), Argentine footballer

Other sportspeople
 Ana Correa (born 1985), Spanish volleyball player
 Carlos Correa (born 1994), Puerto Rican baseball player
 Carmelita Correa (born 1988), Mexican pole vaulter
 Ed Correa (born 1966), Puerto Rican baseball player
 Emilio Correa (born 1953), Cuban boxer, Olympic Gold medalist 1972
 Emilio Correa (born 1985), Cuban boxer, son of E. Correa Sr., PanAm Champion 2007
 Fernando Correa (born 1961), Venezuelan cyclist
 Harold Correa (born 1988), French triple jumper
 Javier Correa (born 1976), Argentine sprint canoeist
 Kai Correa (born 1988), American baseball coach
 Kamalei Correa (born 1994), American football player
 Miguel Correa (born 1983), Argentine sprint canoeist

Other
 Antonio de los Reyes Correa (1665–1758), Puerto Rican military officer of Spanish ancestry
 Antonio Correa Cotto (1926–1952), Puerto Rican criminal
 Carolina Correa Londoño (1905–1986), First Lady of Colombia from 1953 to 1957
 Charles Correa (1930–2015), Indian architect
 Gilberto Correa (born 1943), Venezuelan television personality
 Heriberto Correa Yepes (1916–2010), Colombian Roman Catholic bishop
 Jaime Correa (born 1957), Colombian-American urban planner and architect
 Luis Fernando Correa Bahamon (born 1955), Colombian businessman, philanthropist and investor
 Maevia Noemí Correa (1914–2005), Argentine botanist
 Mathias F. Correa (1910–1963), U.S. intelligence pioneer, lawyer and prosecutor
 Mateo Correa Magallanes (1866–1927), often referred to as Father Correa or St. Mateo Correa, a Mexican Martyr
 Mireya Correa (1940–2022), Panamanian botanist
 Raquel Correa (1934–2012), Chilean journalist

See also
 Corea, an alternate spelling
 Correia or Corrêa, its Portuguese and Galician equivalent

References

Spanish-language surnames